The 424th Bombardment Squadron is an inactive United States Air Force unit.  Its last assignment was with the 307th Bombardment Wing at Lincoln Air Force Base, Nebraska, where it was inactivated on 1 January 1962.

History

Formed as a heavy bombardment squadron in January 1942, trained in the Pacific Northwest under Second Air Force, with Boeing B-17 Flying Fortresses.   Reassigned to Seventh Air Force in Hawaii, November 1942 and performed performing search and rescue and antisubmarine patrols until January 1943 while transitioning to long-range Consolidated B-24 Liberator heavy bombers.

Deployed to the Central Pacific from Hawaii throughout 1943 for long-range combat bombardment operations against Japanese forces in the Central Pacific; New Guinea; Northern Solomon Islands and Eastern Mandates campaigns.  Deployed to the New Hebrides in Melanesia and operated from numerous temporary jungle airfields, engaging in long-range bombardment operations during the Bismarck Archipelago; Western Pacific; Leyte; Luzon and Southern Philippines campaigns until the end of the war in August 1945.   Assigned to Clark Field, Philippines after the war ended, demobilized with personnel returning to the United States, unit inactivated as paper unit in January 1946 in California.

During the Korean War, Tactical Air Command (TAC) trained aircrews at Langley Air Force Base, Virginia.  The three squadrons of the 4400th Combat Crew Training Group performing this mission were Air National Guard (ANG) units that had been called up for the war.  At the start of 1953, these squadrons were returned to state control and the 424d Bombardment Squadron took over the mission, personnel, and equipment of the 122d Bombardment Squadron of the Louisiana ANG. In January 1954, the group mission shifted to tactical bombardment and it was redesignated the 4400th Bombardment Group.   As the group began to anticipate the transition to Martin B-57 Canberra aircraft, TAC decided to replace the Table of Distribution 4400th group and its squadrons with the regular 345th Bombardment Group, which took over their mission in July 1954.

The squadron was activated in 1958 at Lincoln Air Force Base, Nebraska. The squadron also began sending its aircraft to AMARC at Davis–Monthan in late 1961, and the squadron went non-operational.   It was inactivated on 1 January 1962.

Lineage
 Constituted as the 35th Reconnaissance Squadron, (Heavy) on 28 January 1942
 Activated on 15 April 1942
 Redesignated 424th Bombardment Squadron (Heavy) on 22 April 1942
 Redesignated 424th Bombardment Squadron, Heavy in 1944
 Inactivated on 26 December 1945
 Redesignated 424th Bombardment Squadron, Light on 15 November 1952
 Activated on 1 January 1953
 Inactivated on 19 July 1954
 Redesignated 424th Bombardment Squadron, Medium on 11 August 1958
 Activated on 1 September 1958
 Discontinued and inactivated on 1 January 1962

Assignments
 307th Bombardment Group, 15 April 1942 – 26 December 1945
 4430th Air Base Wing (attached to 4400th Combat Crew Training Group), 1 January 1953
 4400th Combat Crew Training Group (later Bombardment Group), 1 May 1953 – 19 July 1954
 307th Bombardment Wing, 1 September 1958 – 1 January 1962.

Stations

 Geiger Field, Washington, 15 April 1942
 Ephrata Army Air Base, Washington, 26 May 1942
 Sioux City Army Air Base, Iowa, 29 September 1942 – 20 October 1942
 Dillingham Airfield, Hawaii Territory, 2 November 1942
 Operated from Henderson Field, Midway Atoll, 22 December 1942 – 24 December 1942
 Operated from Funafuti Airfield, Nanumea, Gilbert Islands, 20 January-c. 1 February 1943
 Operated from Luganville Airfield, Espiritu Santo, New Hebrides, c. 6 February 1943 – c. 18 March 1943
 Koli Airfield, Guadalcanal, Solomon Islands, 18 March 1943
 Operated from Munda Airfield, New Georgia, Solomon Islands, 28 January 1944 – 15 February 1944

 Momote Airfield, Los Negros, Admiralty Islands, 13 May 1944
 Wakde Airfield, Netherlands East Indies, 22 August 1944
 Operated from: Kornasoren (Yebrurro) Airfield, Noemfoor, Schouten Islands, 26 September 1944 – c. 8 November 1944
 Wama Airfield, Morotai, Netherlands East Indies, 10 November 1944
 Clark Field, Luzon, Philippines, 5 September 1945 – 7 December 1945
 Camp Stoneman, California, 26 December 1945
 Langley Air Force Base, Virginia, 1 January 1953 – 19 July 1954
 Lincoln Air Force Base, Nebraska, 1 September 1958 – 1 January 1962.

Aircraft
 Boeing B-17 Flying Fortress, 1942
 Consolidated B-24 Liberator, 1942–1945
 Douglas B-26 Invader, 1953–1954
 Boeing B-47 Stratojet, 1958–1961.

See also

References

Notes

Bibliography

 
 
 

Military units and formations established in 1940
Bombardment squadrons of the United States Air Force
Bombardment squadrons of the United States Army Air Forces